Chico Ejiro (born Chico Maziakpono; died 25 December 2020) was a Nigerian movie director, screenwriter, and producer. Little is known about Ejiro other than he was born in Isoko, Delta, Nigeria, and that he originally studied agriculture, and he was drawn into video production because Nigerians would not buy blank video cassettes. His enormous body of work was typical of the second generation that started in the 1990s when cheap video-production equipment became available in the country. He owned a production company called Grand Touch Pictures, which is based in Lagos.

Nicknamed Mr. Prolific, he directed over 80 movies within a 5-year period—each one shot in as little as three days. They feature story lines relevant to Nigerians. The exact number of movies he has worked on as either director, producer, or both is unknown, but it ranges in the hundreds as of 2007. He was profiled in The New York Times, and Time magazine in 2002.

He died in the early hours of Christmas Day, 25 December 2020. His son died on 15 November 2021, just nearly a year after his death. According to several reports, his son has been battling cancer for years.

Ejiro was married to Joy Ejiro, and they had four children. He had two brothers: Zeb Ejiro, the best-known of the new Nigerian cinema auteurs outside of the country, and Peter Red Ejiro, also a movie producer.

Ejiro was featured in the 2007 documentary Welcome to Nollywood, which followed him as he made Family Affair 1 and Family Affair 2.

See also
List of Nigerian film producers
List of Nigerian film directors

References

External links
 Chico Ejiro at the Internet Movie Database (incomplete filmography)
 The theatrical trailer of Outkast
 News of his death. Aiden Promotions.

Nigerian film directors
Nigerian screenwriters
2020 deaths
Year of birth missing
Nigerian film producers
People from Delta State